Ebdentown, a suburb of Upper Hutt located in the lower North Island of New Zealand, near Upper Hutt Central.

Demographics

Ebdentown had a population of 2,481 at the 2018 New Zealand census, an increase of 132 people (5.6%) since the 2013 census, and an increase of 129 people (5.5%) since the 2006 census. There were 1,047 households. There were 1,224 males and 1,257 females, giving a sex ratio of 0.97 males per female. The median age was 41.7 years (compared with 37.4 years nationally), with 480 people (19.3%) aged under 15 years, 393 (15.8%) aged 15 to 29, 1,125 (45.3%) aged 30 to 64, and 486 (19.6%) aged 65 or older.

Ethnicities were 79.3% European/Pākehā, 17.0% Māori, 5.4% Pacific peoples, 10.9% Asian, and 2.3% other ethnicities (totals add to more than 100% since people could identify with multiple ethnicities).

The proportion of people born overseas was 20.6%, compared with 27.1% nationally.

Although some people objected to giving their religion, 45.3% had no religion, 39.3% were Christian, 2.5% were Hindu, 0.7% were Muslim, 1.1% were Buddhist and 4.1% had other religions.

Of those at least 15 years old, 318 (15.9%) people had a bachelor or higher degree, and 447 (22.3%) people had no formal qualifications. The median income was $29,900, compared with $31,800 nationally. The employment status of those at least 15 was that 939 (46.9%) people were employed full-time, 243 (12.1%) were part-time, and 90 (4.5%) were unemployed.

Education

References

Suburbs of Upper Hutt
Populated places on Te Awa Kairangi / Hutt River